Fairhaven station may refer to:

 Ansdell and Fairhaven railway station in Lancashire, England, United Kingdom
 Fairhaven Station in Bellingham, Washington, United States